Yazmeen Alexis Jamieson (born 17 March 1998) is a footballer who plays as a goalkeeper for Simcoe County Rovers FC in League1 Ontario. Born in Canada, she represents the Jamaica women's national team.

Early life 
Jamieson was born to a Jamaican father and a Grenadian mother. She started playing soccer at age 6. She attended Bayview Glen School, winning the Elite Athlete Award. She played youth soccer with Toronto Eagles SC and Unionville Milliken SC. She was awarded the 2017 Grenada Association of Toronto Diaspora Award.

Playing career

College 
She played for Carleton University from 2016 to 2018 and suffered from an injury in 2017. In 2019, she gave up her college eligibility in order to play professionally overseas in New Zealand to improve her chances for the Jamaican national team selection for the 2019 FIFA Women's World Cup.

Club 
In 2019, she joined New Zealand club Papakura City, where she made her senior debut

In 2021, Yazmeen signed a short-term contract with the Swedish club P18 IK in the second division. She started 6 out of the seven matches she was there for and helped bring the team to the final playoffs round. The team won the final match therefore promoting them to Division 1 in Sweden.

In 2022, she joined Canadian club Simcoe County Rovers in League1 Ontario. She was named a league Third Team All-Star in 2022.

In September 2022, she joined GPSO 92 Issy in the French Division 2 Féminine.

In 2023, she returned to Simcoe County Rovers FC.

International career
In 2013, at age 15, while on a tour to Jamaica with her youth club team, the Jamaican women's technical director learned of her Jamaican  heritage and arranged for her to trial with the Jamaican U20 team. Soon after, she made the roster for the Jamaican U17 team for the U17 World Cup qualifier, however, she was unable to secure her Jamaican citizenship and passport in time and was unable to join the team.

In November 2017, she received her first cap to the Jamaica U20. She was later named to the roster for the 2018 CONCACAF Women's U-20 Championship.

In 2018, she was named to the Jamaica senior team for the first time.

References

External links

1998 births
Living people
Citizens of Jamaica through descent
Jamaican women's footballers
Women's association football goalkeepers
Jamaica women's international footballers
2019 FIFA Women's World Cup players
Pan American Games competitors for Jamaica
Footballers at the 2019 Pan American Games
Sportspeople of Grenadian descent
Soccer players from Toronto
Canadian women's soccer players
Carleton Ravens women's soccer players
Black Canadian women's soccer players
Jamaican people of Grenadian descent
Canadian sportspeople of Jamaican descent
Canadian people of Grenadian descent
Unionville Milliken SC (women) players
Papakura City FC players
Simcoe County Rovers FC players
League1 Ontario (women) players
GPSO 92 Issy players